This page lists the squads for the men's football at the 1996 Summer Olympics. 

Overage players are marked with * and players added due to injury are marked with °.

Group A

Argentina
Head coach: Daniel Passarella

Portugal
Head coach: Nelo Vingada

Tunisia
Head coach:  Henryk Kasperczak

United States
Head coach: Bruce Arena

Group B

Australia
Head coach:  Eddie Thomson

France
Head coach: Raymond Domenech

Saudi Arabia
Head coach:  Ivo Wortmann

Spain
Head coach: Javier Clemente

Group C

Ghana
Head coach: Sam Arday

Italy
Head coach: Cesare Maldini

South Korea

Head coach:  Anatoliy Byshovets

Mexico
Head coach: Carlos de los Cobos

Group D

Brazil
Head coach: Zagallo

Hungary
Head coach: Antal Dunai

Japan
Head coach: Akira Nishino

Nigeria
Head coach:  Jo Bonfrere

References
Match reports (FIFA.com)
Squads

1996 Summer Olympics Men's
Football at the 1996 Summer Olympics